Nnamdi (pronounced nahm-dee) is a traditional male given name used by the Igbo people of Nigeria. It means "my God is alive" or "my father lives." The name may refer to:

Nnamdi Asomugha (born 1981), American football player
Nnamdi Azikiwe (1904–1996), Nigerian politician and president
Nnamdi Kanu (born 1967), British political activist 
Nnamdi Moweta (born 1958), American radio host
Nnamdi Oduamadi (born 1990), Nigerian football player
Nnamdi Ogbonnaya (born 1990), American musician
Nnamdi Udoh (born 1960), Nigerian businessman
Kojo Nnamdi (born 1945), American journalist

See also
Nnamani

References

African masculine given names
Igbo names